Northern Borderlands dialect is a dialect of Polish language, spoken by the Polish minorities in Lithuania and in northwestern Belarus.

Citations

Notes

References 

Polish dialects
Languages of Lithuania
Languages of Belarus